Motormouthmedia is a public relations firm based in Los Angeles. The company's roster includes acts such as Dirty Projectors, Animal Collective, Deerhunter, and Flying Lotus. Judy Miller Silverman has been the owner of the company since 1997.

References

External links
 Official website

Public relations companies of the United States
Companies based in Los Angeles County, California